Heinrich Lanz (9 March 1838, in Friedrichshafen – 1 February 1905, in Mannheim) was a German entrepreneur and engineer. He founded Heinrich Lanz AG, a manufacturer of agricultural machinery and stationary steam engines and locomotives exported globally.

Life 

Heinrich Lanz was born in Friedrichshafen on 9 March 1838, the fourth of seven children of shipping magnate Johann Peter Lanz and Luise Christiane Beckh. He attended primary school in his native Friedrichshafen, secondary school in Biberach an der Riss, and then got apprenticed at a grocery store in Mannheim and enrolled at a trade school in Stuttgart. Following this, he entered his father's business, preparing agricultural fertilizer and machinery for export to England.

In 1859, Heinrich Lanz founded Heinrich Lanz AG in Mannheim. In 1865, he married Jula Faul and had four children with her.

References

External links 

 
 

German mechanical engineers
German company founders
19th-century German businesspeople
1838 births
1905 deaths
People from Friedrichshafen
Engineers from Baden-Württemberg